Alexander Browne (died 1942) was a Northern Irish politician.

Alexander Browne may also refer to:

Alexander Browne (artist); see Arnold de Jode
Alexander Browne (figure skating) in 2008 Canadian Figure Skating Championships
Alexander Browne (painter); see Thomas Thynne (died 1682)

See also
Alex Browne (disambiguation)
Alexander Brown (disambiguation)